Erciyes Ski Resort is a ski resort in Turkey, near the city of Kayseri. It is situated at Mount Erciyes, the highest mountain in Central Anatolia.

The ski centre at Mt Erciyes is located on the north to east side of the mountain with the same name. It is possible to try 'cultural skiing' on a visit to neighbouring Cappadocia which is located just an hour away from Kayseri. Mt Erciyes ski  has a total of  different levels of slopes and unlimited off-pistes.

International winter sports events hosted
The ski resort hosted CEV Snow Volleyball European Tour events in [2017, 2019, and 2022.

References

External links
https://www.erciyeskayakmerkezi.com

Ski areas and resorts in Turkey
Buildings and structures in Kayseri Province
Tourist attractions in Kayseri Province